Novikombank is a Russian bank specializing in financing of enterprises in the heavy-machinery, automotive, high-tech, oil and gas industry. Novikombank is ranked among the top 40 largest Russian banks. Member of the deposit insurance system.

Ownership 
As on 15 February 2016, Novikombank is 57,68% owned by Rostec.

Subsidiaries and associated companies 
According to the decision of the Bank of Russia Board of Directors in April 2015, Novikombank participates in the financial rehabilitation of OJSC FundServiceBank.

In September 2021, the analytical credit rating agency ACRA upgraded Novikombank's credit rating to A+(RU) (outlook stable).

Activities 
Novikombank is one of the banks authorized to work under the state defence order.

"Banking Business" prize winner.

"Most Export Oriented Russian Bank"  prize winner in the "Exporter of the Year 2014" competition.

Recapitalization of Novikombank though Federal Loan Obligations (PFZ) in July 2015.

Sanctions 

Sanctioned by New Zealand in relation to the 2022 Russian invasion of Ukraine.

References 

Rostec
Banks of Russia
Companies based in Moscow